Luqman Butt (born 24 December 1994) is a Pakistani first-class cricketer who plays for Khan Research Laboratories.

References

External links
 

1994 births
Living people
Pakistani cricketers
Khan Research Laboratories cricketers
Cricketers from Gujranwala